Gene Stephenson (born August 31, 1945) is an American retired college baseball coach, who served as the head baseball coach at Wichita State from 1978 to 2013.

Career
When he arrived at Wichita State, he inherited a program that had been dormant for over seven years.  In his first year, despite not playing a home game until their 18th game, his Shockers finished with a winning record.  In his third year, they made the first NCAA Tournament appearance in school history, and in his fifth they advanced all the way to the title game.   The team, with four first team All-Americans (seven overall), lost to Miami.  This was all the more remarkable considering that until 1984, they played at a bare-bones stadium with only a tiny bleacher section for seating.  The momentum from their 1982 title game appearance helped spearhead the building of a permanent facility, Eck Stadium, in 1985.

Under his leadership, the Shockers made seven College World Series and 26 NCAA tournament appearances, including 14 straight from 1987 to 2000. His teams never had a losing season.  His 1982 team went 73–14, establishing an NCAA record for single-season wins.  Stephenson won his first CWS championship in 1989; also in 1989, the Shockers won 24 consecutive games.

Prior to coaching at WSU, he served as an assistant coach at Oklahoma. During that tenure, the Sooners won five league championships, and went to five College World Series.

For most of the day on July 10, 2005, Stephenson was the head coach of Oklahoma.  Several hours after accepting the job, however, Stephenson decided to remain at Wichita State, reportedly due to scholarship issues at Oklahoma.

After 36 years, Stephenson was fired on June 4, 2013.

Personal life
Born in Council Grove, Kansas; Gene attended Guthrie High School, Guthrie, Oklahoma, then attended the University of Missouri with his first year on a football scholarship.  He had better luck playing baseball, however; as a first baseman under legendary coach Hi Simmons, he was an All-American in 1967.  Stephenson served a three-year stint in the United States Army, spending one year in Vietnam.  Gene has two children, Jay and Ginny.

His younger brother is Phil Stephenson, who played under him from 1980 to 1983.  Gene and Phil were inducted into the Guthrie High School Hall of Fame in 1994. Gene was a first team all-state honoree in football and baseball in his senior year.

Head coaching record
The following is a table of Stephenson's yearly records as an NCAA head baseball coach.

See also
 List of college baseball coaches with 1,100 wins
 Kansas Sports Hall of Fame

Notes

References

1945 births
Living people
United States Army personnel of the Vietnam War
Baseball first basemen
Missouri Tigers baseball coaches
Missouri Tigers baseball players
Missouri Tigers football players
Oklahoma Sooners baseball coaches
Wichita State Shockers baseball coaches
People from Guthrie, Oklahoma
United States Army soldiers
National College Baseball Hall of Fame inductees